Lyophyllum eucalypticum is a species of fungus in the family Lyophyllaceae. Found in Australia, it was first described as a species of Tricholoma by English mycologist Arthur Anselm Pearson in 1951. Meinhard Michael Moser transferred it to Lyophyllum in 1986. This white, wooly tropical mushroom is similar to other mushroom species, such as Macrofungus that looks similar but only grows in Australia. The distinguishing features are its deep purple borders, which are typically trimmed with black rings. It has wide wings that spread out as the mushroom matures.

References

External links

Lyophyllaceae
Fungi described in 1951
Fungi of Australia